The Arthur L. Day Medal is a prize awarded by the Geological Society of America, established in 1948 by Arthur Louis Day for "outstanding distinction in contributing to geologic knowledge through the application of physics and chemistry to the solution of geologic problems".

List of winners
Source: Geological Society of America

See also

 List of geology awards
 Prizes named after people

External links

Geological Society of America
Geology awards
Awards established in 1948
American science and technology awards